Neurum is a rural town and locality in the Moreton Bay Region, Queensland, Australia.

Geography

The northern boundary is marked by the Stanley River.  The eastern boundary is naturally vegetated and elevated along a ridge which peaks at Neurum Mountain which lies within a large reserve.

History
The town takes its name from Neurum Creek, which in turn uses a word from Waka language (Dungidau dialect) meaning ''warts, sores or pock marks''.

Neurum Creek Provisional School opened on 2 August 1880. On 1 January 1909 it became Neurum Creek State School. It closed circa 1942.

Neurum Post Office opened on 11 December 1880 (known as Neurum Creek between 1887 and 1913) and closed in 1957.

The median age of the Neurum population was 42 years, 5 years above the national median of 37. 75.3% of people living in Neurum were born in Australia. The other top responses for country of birth were England 2.4%, Fiji 1.8%, Denmark 1.8%, Kenya 1.8%, Czech Republic 1.8%. 87% of people spoke only English at home; the next most common language was 1.8% Danish.

References

External links

 

Suburbs of Moreton Bay Region
Localities in Queensland